Thoroughly Modern Bing is a long-playing vinyl album recorded by Bing Crosby for Pickwick Records at Mastertone Recording Studio in Long Island City, New York. The orchestral tracks were conducted by "Bugs" Bower with a vocal group under the direction of Don Marshall.  Crosby subsequently over-dubbed his vocals at two separate sessions in February 1968.

Another song, "Where the Rainbow Ends" was also recorded on February 12, 1968 but did not appear on the original vinyl album. It was included on a LaserLight CD in 1991. A song called "That's All I Want from You" (written by M. Rotha) was also recorded on the same day but has never surfaced.

The album was issued on CD in 1991 by LaserLight as "Bing Crosby - A Visit to the Movies (CD: 15 411) and by Pickwick Records in 1997 as "Bing Crosby at His Best" (1128-2). The song "(I Call You) Sunshine" was not included on the LaserLight CD.

Reception
Billboard said: "In this uptempo album, the old crooner shows that he still has much of the fire that ranked him among yesterday's superstars. Here he is applying his unique style to some recent top chart riders with interesting results."

The British publication "The Gramophone" commented: "Meanwhile there is overwhelming evidence that Mr. Crosby has lost none of his charm or skill in Thoroughly Modern Bing (Stateside SL10257). He works his lasting magic on “Talk to the Animals,” “Love Is Blue,” “Chim Chim Cheree,” and other modern songs of quality plus the oldie “Ding Dong the Witch Is Dead” with the same ease and warmth that was discernible in 1928. He even transforms a blatant flag-waver like “What’s More American” into something tolerable, and is the first singer to hold my attention throughout “Puff (The Magic Dragon)” without causing a single wince."

Track listing

References

External links
 BING magazine
 BingCrosby.com
 Bing Crosby on Facebook
 Crosby Fan World

1968 albums
Bing Crosby albums